The Bicăjel is a right tributary of the river Bicaz in Romania. It discharges into the Bicaz near Bicaz-Chei.

References

Rivers of Romania
Rivers of Neamț County